Jon Irazustabarrena Lizarralde (born 30 April 1986), known as Txusta, is a Spanish footballer who plays for Real Unión as a goalkeeper.

Club career
Born in Usurbil, Gipuzkoa, Txusta graduated from Real Sociedad's youth system, and made his debuts with the reserves in the 2003–04 season, in Segunda División B. In 2005, he signed for neighbouring SD Beasain from Tercera División.

In the summer of 2007, Txusta was recalled by Sanse, but after being sparingly used he returned to Beasain in July 2008. In August 2009 he joined another reserve team, SD Eibar B also in the fourth level; he remained in that tier for the following three years, representing CD Lagun Onak and Beasain.

On 29 January 2013, Txusta signed with division three club SD Eibar. He appeared in four matches during the campaign, as the team returned to Segunda División after a four-year absence.

On 31 May 2014, as the Basque side were already promoted to La Liga, 28-year-old Txusta played his first match as a professional, starting in a 1–0 home win against CD Lugo. Roughly a month later, he renewed his contract for a further year.

On 15 July 2015, Txusta signed for Real Unión in the third tier after being released by Eibar. The following 6 July, he joined fellow league team Barakaldo CF.

References

External links

1986 births
Living people
People from Usurbil
Spanish footballers
Footballers from the Basque Country (autonomous community)
Association football goalkeepers
Segunda División players
Segunda División B players
Primera Federación players
Sportspeople from Gipuzkoa
Real Sociedad B footballers
SD Beasain footballers
SD Eibar footballers
Real Unión footballers
Barakaldo CF footballers